Pseudartonis is a genus of African orb-weaver spiders first described by Eugène Simon in 1895.

Species
 it contains four species:
Pseudartonis flavonigra Caporiacco, 1947 – Ethiopia
Pseudartonis lobata Simon, 1909 – East Africa
Pseudartonis occidentalis Simon, 1903 (type) – Guinea-Bissau, Cameroon
Pseudartonis semicoccinea Simon, 1907 – São Tomé and Príncipe

References

Araneidae
Araneomorphae genera
Spiders of Africa
Taxa named by Eugène Simon